The discography of American country music band Blackhawk comprises six studio albums, two compilation albums, one live album, 24 singles, and 17 music videos. Released in 1994, the band's self-titled debut included five top 40 hits on the Hot Country Songs charts, all but one of which made top 10. Its followup, Strong Enough, produced two more top 10 hits. Although the band never achieved a number one in the United States, two of their songs made number one on the RPM Country Tracks chart in Canada.

Albums

Studio albums

Compilation albums

Live albums

Singles

As lead artist

As featured artist

Other charted songs

Music videos

Notes

References

Blackhawk (band)
 
 
Discographies of American artists